Virginia's 35th Senate district is one of 40 districts in the Senate of Virginia. It has been represented by Democrat Dick Saslaw, the current Senate Majority Leader, since 1980.

Geography
District 35 covers all of Falls Church and parts of Fairfax County and Alexandria in the suburbs of Washington, D.C., including some or all of Merrifield, Idylwood, West Falls Church, Seven Corners, Bailey's Crossroads, Lincolnia, Annandale, Springfield, and West Springfield. At just over 32 square miles, it is the smallest Senate district in Virginia.

The district overlaps with Virginia's 8th and 11th congressional districts, and with the 38th, 39th, 42nd, 46th, 49th, and 53rd districts of the Virginia House of Delegates.

Recent election results

2019

2015

2011

Historical election results
All election results below took place prior to 2011 redistricting, and thus were under different district lines.

2007

2003

1999

1995

Recent results in statewide elections

References

Virginia Senate districts
Government in Fairfax County, Virginia
Alexandria, Virginia
Falls Church, Virginia